is a Japanese swimmer. She won a silver medal in the 200m breaststroke event and a bronze medal in the 100m breaststroke at the 2012 Summer Olympics, as well as a silver in the women's 4 x 100 m medley relay for Japan. She also swam in the 100 m breaststroke and 4 x 100 m medley relay at the 2016 Summer Olympics.  She currently belongs to Yamanashi Gakuin University swimming club.

References

Swimmers at the 2012 Summer Olympics
Swimmers at the 2016 Summer Olympics
Olympic swimmers of Japan
1991 births
Living people
Olympic silver medalists for Japan
Olympic bronze medalists for Japan
Olympic bronze medalists in swimming
Sportspeople from Fukuoka Prefecture
Asian Games medalists in swimming
Swimmers at the 2010 Asian Games
Medalists at the 2012 Summer Olympics
Swimmers at the 2014 Asian Games
Swimmers at the 2018 Asian Games
Japanese female breaststroke swimmers
Olympic silver medalists in swimming
Universiade medalists in swimming
Asian Games gold medalists for Japan
Asian Games silver medalists for Japan
Asian Games bronze medalists for Japan
Medalists at the 2010 Asian Games
Medalists at the 2014 Asian Games
Medalists at the 2018 Asian Games
Universiade bronze medalists for Japan
Medalists at the 2011 Summer Universiade